Edwin Earl "Jolly" Brown (October 18, 1939 – August 26, 2006) was an American actor.

Brown's best known role was as Whisper, a henchman in the 1973 James Bond film Live and Let Die. Other film appearances include Black Belt Jones (1974), Truck Turner (1974) and Linda Lovelace for President (1975). He was also active on television, with credits including Perry Mason, The Odd Couple, and Laverne and Shirley.

Filmography

References

External links
 
 List of names - Edwin Earl Brown (deceased) from Clark County, Las Vegas

1939 births
2006 deaths
Place of birth missing
African-American male actors
American male film actors
Male actors from Houston
American male television actors
20th-century American male actors
20th-century African-American people
21st-century African-American people